The Martins is a comedy, produced and released in 2001, written and directed by Tony Grounds, starring Lee Evans and Kathy Burke. The film was released in the United Kingdom on 14 September 2001.

Synopsis
Out of work scrounger Robert Martin lives with his dysfunctional family who are long-suffering wife Angie, accident-prone son Little Bob, who is bullied at school even by his teacher who Robert brandishes a gun at, and pregnant teenage of 14 daughter Katie. They live in a shabby house in Hatfield, next door to the Galleria Shopping Centre above the A1, about twenty five miles north of London.

Competition addict Robert dreams of winning a holiday for his family to a dream island, which turns out to be the Isle Of Man. He fails to win a competition. Feeling cheated out of a win, he flips and first goes to the editor's office with a gun and steals his suit, then to an ice cream shop with his family and steals a parrot from a pet shop for Little Bob's birthday.

Robert tracks down the elderly winners, threatens them with a gun, ties them up in the cellar and steals their tickets. The police find them tied up. Upon arriving, Angie finds out Robert has cheated on her with their next door neighbour, however, the family enjoy the holiday. The Police eventually catch up with Martin; he is convicted and sent to prison. He is later released to find his family life has improved.

References

External links
 
 

2001 films
British comedy films
2001 comedy films
Films set on the Isle of Man
Films produced by Bruce Davey
2001 directorial debut films
2000s English-language films
2000s British films